Ronald Lorenzo Watson Jr. (born April 30, 1966) is an American politician. He is a Democrat representing District 23 in the Maryland Senate.

Personal life 

Watson was born in Seat Pleasant, Maryland and graduated from Central Senior High School in Capitol Heights, Maryland. He holds a Bachelor of Science degree from Morgan State University, a Master of Science degree and a PhD from Binghamton University, and an MBA from George Washington University. He served in the U.S. Army Reserves from 1991 to 2006.

Political career 

Watson served on the Board of Education in Prince George's County, Maryland from 2006 to 2010.

In 2014, Watson ran for election to one of two District 23B seats in the Maryland House of Delegates, but lost the Democratic primary to incumbents Marvin E. Holmes Jr. and Joseph F. Vallario Jr. In 2018, he ran again, and came out on top among a field of seven candidates; together with Marvin E. Holmes Jr., he advanced to general election, where they were the only candidates on the ballot.

As of June 2020, Watson sits on the following committees:
 Judiciary Committee
 Family Law Subcommittee
 Juvenile Law Subcommittee
 Joint Committee on Cybersecurity, Information Technology, and Biotechnology

Electoral record

References 

Living people
Democratic Party members of the Maryland House of Delegates
21st-century American politicians
1966 births